John Ward Hunter (October 15, 1807 – April 16, 1900) was an American banker and politician who served briefly as a United States representative from New York from late 1866 to early 1867. He also served as mayor of Brooklyn.

Biography 
Born in Bedford neighborhood of Brooklyn (now known as Bedford Stuyvesant), he received a liberal schooling and was a clerk in a wholesale grocery store in New York City in 1824. He was a clerk in the U.S. Custom House at New York City from 1831 to 1836, and was assistant auditor of the customhouse from 1836 to 1865.

He engaged in banking as treasurer of the Dime Savings Bank in Brooklyn.

Congress 
He was elected as a Democrat to the Thirty-ninth Congress to fill the vacancy caused by the death of James Humphrey. Hunter held office from December 4, 1866 to March 3, 1867; while in Congress, he was censured by the House of Representatives on January 26, 1867 for the use of unparliamentary language. He was not a candidate for renomination in 1866.

Mayor
In 1875 and 1876 he was mayor of Brooklyn.  His successor as mayor was Frederick A. Schroeder, a Republican. Hunter was elected the first President of the Society of Old Brooklynites.  The prestigious civic organization which was founded in 1880, still holds monthly public meetings in the Brooklyn Surrogate's Courtroom.
He resumed banking and died in Brooklyn; interment was in Green-Wood Cemetery.

Hunter was censured by the United States House of Representatives. This was the tenth time in American history that a Representative was censured. The report cites "Insulted another member during debate (January 26, 1867)" as the reason for this condemnation.

See also

List of United States representatives expelled, censured, or reprimanded

References

External links
 

|-

1807 births
1900 deaths
19th-century American politicians
Burials at Green-Wood Cemetery
Censured or reprimanded members of the United States House of Representatives
Democratic Party members of the United States House of Representatives from New York (state)
Erasmus Hall High School alumni
Mayors of Brooklyn